Lego Masters is a British reality show in which teams compete to build the best Lego project. During its original run, it was hosted by Melvin Odoom and judged by Lego designer Matthew Ashton and structural engineer Roma Agrawal (series one) and Fran Scott (series two). Lego Masters premiered on Channel 4 on 24 August 2017. After a hiatus of four years, the show came back for a Christmas special on 24 December 2022 hosted by Nish Kumar and judged by Ashton and Amy Corbett from the US version of Lego Masters. The programme is produced by Tuesday's Child. The 2022 Christmas special was filmed in Warsaw, on the set of Poland's Lego Masters, and co-produced by Endemol Shine Polska.

The series has received strong reviews and positive comparisons to The Great British Bake Off.

Series details

Series 1 (2017)
The first series aired on Channel 4 on 24 August 2017 and ended on 14 September 2017. This four-part series of Lego Masters commenced with auditions for 48 teams from across the UK and Ireland. They were whittled down to just eight pairs who battled in the Build Room to stay in the competition. The series was won by Nate & Steve who won the brick trophy and got to display their work at the then new Lego Museum in Billund, Denmark. During the finals it was decided that runner-up father and son duo Nicolas and Kobe would also have their work exhibited at the museum.

Series 2 (2018)
The second series aired on Channel 4 on 6 November 2018 and ended on 4 December 2018. A Christmas special was broadcast on 11 December 2018. The series was won by Paul & Lewis.

International adaptations

Since its conception, the series format has been sold internationally to multiple different countries including Denmark, Germany, New Zealand, Australia, United States, The Netherlands and Belgium, Sweden, Colombia, France, Finland, Chile & Poland.

References

Notes

External links 
 
 

2017 British television series debuts
2018 British television series endings
2010s British reality television series
Channel 4 original programming
English-language television shows
Lego television series
Reality competition television series